Braunschweig Hauptbahnhof is a railway station in the German city of Braunschweig (Brunswick). The train services are operated by Deutsche Bahn, Erixx, Metronom and WestfalenBahn.

History

Due to the growing traffic of the post-war era, the need of a new main station was urgent. There had long been disadvantages in the construction and location of the old terminal station and it had become out of date. It was decided to build a new through station on the outskirts of the city in the district now called Viewegs Garten.

This was on the grounds above the Braunschweig East station (Ostbahnhof, also called St. Leonhard station, marshalling yard or freight yard).   The laying of tracks for the future station began as early as the 1930s. The final location was a compromise, with the cost and area to be demolished to be kept as low as possible.

The first discussions and plans for a new station were made in 1870 in Tappe's plan for the expansion of the city. Even then, the current location was favoured.

Several plans between 1870  and 1934, including Rincklake's plan for the station in 1889, saw a new station in the area of the modern exhibition centre in the vicinity of Eisenbüttel or between Eisenbüttel and the old station. In 1889, a station was proposed at the original site but rotated 180 degrees. An unusual proposal was put forward in 1908 with the future station orientated north–south at the end of today's Jasperallee (to the northeast of the old town). However, this idea received little support as it would have been necessary to cut through an intact residential district.
 
For years, no agreement was reached. The conversion of the old station into a through station was rejected because it would have cost more than the construction of a new station. The building of a line to a new through station was difficult as the area around the old city of Braunschweig was already heavily developed at the end of the 19th century. 
	
Between 1909 and 1932, there were concrete plans for a new through station in the area of the modern exhibition centre, that is south of the old station. The Kaiser-Wilhelm-Platz would be built just north of the station. A new wide boulevard would be built from the Kaiser-Wilhelm-Platz running north–south to connect the new station to the old town.

In 1938, the plan of 1870 was again revived, detailed planning began and tracks were laid. This work ended with the outbreak of the Second World War. Planning was resumed in the 1950s and in 1953 it was decided to retain the location planned in 1938.

Planning

Contracts were signed by the City of Braunschweig, Deutsche Bundesbahn and Braunschweigische Staatsbank (Braunschweig state bank) for the through station in 1956. A competition for design concepts for the new central station was advertised in May 1956 and 51 proposals were submitted for the new building. Excavation work for the platform tunnel began on 28 May 1956. The jury announced the result of the architectural competition on 27 June 1956. Two second prizes were awarded to Erwin Dürkop from Hanover and J. Kiesewetter from Bayreuth.

Construction

The first sod for the new building was turned by Hans-Christoph Seebohm, the then Transport Minister, on 19 February 1957. The platform tunnel was completed on 7 November 1958, and its topping-out ceremony was celebrated on 21 November 1958.

The foundation stone was laid for the entrance building on 24 March 1959 and its topping out ceremony was held on 15 October 1959. After three years of construction and ten years of planning the new Braunschweig Hauptbahnhof was opened on 1 October 1960. The station building, including its  and  office building, was designed by Erwin Dürkop, an architect from Deutsche Bundesbahn's headquarters. It was modelled on Roma Termini station.
	
The station has been on the Intercity network since 1979 and has been connected to the Intercity-Express network  since 1993. In May 1993, a Regional-Express service ran for the first time from Braunschweig to Magdeburg.

The station building has been heritage-listed since 1993.

On 25 and 26 October 2003, a new electronic interlocking was put into operation, which remotely controlled 84 sets of points and 102 signals between Groß Gleidingen and Weddel from the operations centre in Hannover.

Environment

With the building of the new train station, extensive construction work began nearby. The main objectives were the realisation of the extension of the Wilhelmine ring road system, which was conceived in the 19th century by Ludwig Winter, who planned the construction of a station square (Bahnhofplatz) and a station road (Bahnhofstraße) that would connect the new station with the centre of the city 2 km away. In the course of the construction, several houses were demolished. In August 1958, the demolition of the houses began in Heitbergstraße to make way for the new road layout. In February 1960, the demolition of houses followed in Friedrichsplatz. Berliner Platz emerged outside the station and it was rebuilt during the 1960s and 1970s. As part of the relocation of the station, the main post office was moved from the inner city to Berliner Platz.

On 15 June 1970, a pedestrian overpass was completed between the Hauptbahnhof and the Hotel Atrium over the Berliner Platz, together with a tavern. The overpass was demolished in 1999.

In the following years the station district was refurbished. The first section was completed in 1992 and  the second in June 2006.

Transport terminal

In 1999 to 2000, in preparation for Expo 2000, a local transport terminal was built in front of the station. The inauguration of the installation, which is protected against the weather with a 100-metre-long canopy, was carried out in May 2000. Simultaneously, the first tracks (with an additional standard gauge rail) were laid for the future standard gauge tramway in the area of the station. In local services, it was proposed that lines 1, 2, 3 and 10 of the RegioStadtBahn (regional light rail) would also serve the station, with work starting in about 2014, although this is in doubt. Its first stage would connect the station and Braunschweig North station (Nordbahnhof) with Salzgitter, Goslar, Bad Harzburg, Schöppenstedt, Gifhorn and Uelzen. The RegioStadtBahn would use two unused platforms in the local station, which as yet have no tracks. The connection to the DB network would take place in the immediate vicinity with an on and off ramp from the embankment. In 2005, a new tram link on the Heinrich-Büssing-Ring was opened to the station. It connects the station with the suburbs of Heidberg, Melverode and Stöckheim in the south of Braunschweig. The new route to Stöckheim was commissioned on 15 October 2006.

Train services

The station is served by the following services:

Long-distance

Regional
Regional services  Hildesheim - Braunschweig - Wolfsburg
Regional services  Rheine - Osnabrück - Minden - Hanover - Braunschweig
Regional services  Bielefeld - Herford - Minden - Hanover - Braunschweig
Local services  Braunschweig - Helmstedt - Magdeburg - Burg
Local services  Bad Harzburg - Vienenburg - Wolfenbüttel - Braunschweig
Local services  Goslar - Vienenburg - Wolfenbüttel - Braunschweig
Local services  Salzgitter - Braunschweig
Local services  Braunschweig - Wolfenbüttel - Schöppenstedt
Local services  Herzberg - Osterode - Seesen - Salzgitter - Braunschweig
Local services  Uelzen - Wittingen - Gifhorn - Braunschweig
Local services   Braunschweig - Salzgitter-Thiede - Salzgitter-Lebenstedt

Traffic connections
The station has connections and interchanges with the following lines:

Tram

 : Stöckheim – Hauptbahnhof (main station)– Rathaus (city hall) – Wenden
 : Heidberg – Leisewitzstraße – Rathaus – Siegfriedviertel Hauptbahnhof instead of Leisewitzstraße only in the evening and on Sundays
 : Hauptbahnhof – Zentrum – Weststadt – Broitzem
 :  Hauptbahnhof – Rathaus –  Rühme Monday-Friday only approx 06:00-19:00

Bus
 419  Hauptbahnhof – Ostring – Westring – Messegelände (exhibition centre) – Hauptbahnhof

 429  Hauptbahnhof – Messegelände – Westring – Ostring – Hauptbahnhof

 420  Wolfenbüttel Bahnhof – Hauptbahnhof – Rathaus

 431  Helmstedter Straße – Rautheim – Stöckheim – Melverode – Heidberg – Hauptbahnhof

 411  Mascherode – Bebelhof – Hauptbahnhof – Rathaus – Lehndorf – Lamme

 461  Hauptbahnhof – Zentrum – Lehndorf – PTB – Völkenrode

 601   620  Salzgitter-Lebenstedt – Hauptbahnhof

 603   631  Salzgitter-Bad – Hauptbahnhof

 730  Wilhelmstr. – Hauptbahnhof – Sickte – Evessen – Schöppenstedt

Notes

References

External links 
 

Railway stations in Lower Saxony
Central Station
Central Station
Railway stations in Germany opened in 1960
1960 establishments in West Germany